Hieracium cymosum is a species of plant from family Asteraceae found everywhere throughout Europe (except for Iceland, Ireland, Great Britain, Portugal, Russia, and Spain).

References

Flora of Europe
Plants described in 1763
cymosum
Taxa named by Carl Linnaeus